William Golding (1911–1993) was a British writer.

William or Bill Golding may also refer to:

 William Henry Golding (1878-1961), a Liberal party member of the Canadian House of Commons
William Hughson Golding, founder of Golding & Company
William Golding, master of HMS Manly (1804)
Bill Golding, Australian rules footballer

See also
 William Goulding (disambiguation)
William Golden (disambiguation)